Ab Lashkar may refer to:
 Ab Lashkar-e Olya, a village in the Rud Zard Rural District, Iran
 Ab Lashkar-e Sofla, a village in the Rud Zard Rural District, Iran
 Ab Lashkar-e Vosta, a village in the Rud Zard Rural District, Iran